KCCR-FM (104.5 FM) is a radio station licensed to Blunt, South Dakota, United States. The station airs an active rock music format, and is owned by Riverfront Broadcasting LLC.

References

External links

CCR-FM
Active rock radio stations in the United States
Riverfront Broadcasting LLC